Espaillat may refer to:

Places
 Espaillat Province, a province in the Dominican Republic

People
Adriano Espaillat (born 1954), Dominican-born American politician, U.S. Representative for New York's 13th congressional district. Great-grandson of Ulises Espaillat. 
Alejandro Enrique Grullón Espaillat (1929–2020), Dominican banker. Great-great-grandson of Ulises Espaillat.
Francisco Espaillat (1734–1807), French-born Dominican surgeon, Lieutenant-Governor of Santo Domingo for the Northern region and planter.
Rhina Espaillat (born 1932), Dominican-born American poet, fourth-great-granddaughter of Dr. Santiago Espaillat (President-elect of the Dominican Republic) and fifth-great-granddaughter of Francisco Espaillat.
Ulises Espaillat (1823–1878), author and politician, Senator and President of the Dominican Republic, grandson of Francisco Espaillat.

Sports
Espaillat Men (volleyball club), male volleyball team of Espaillat Province
Espaillat Women, female volleyball team of Espaillat Province